Make Some Noise is the second album by Liquid Soul.

Track listing
 "Intro" – 	0:45
 "Threadin' The Needle" – 	4:05
 "Salt Peanuts/Chocolate Covered Nut" – 	4:44
 "Yankee Girl" – 	5:21
 "I Want You To Want Me" – 	4:28
 "Ricky's Hat" – 	3:56
 "Cabbage Roll" – 	4:47
 "Ramblin'" – 	2:58
 "Cookie's Puss" – 	4:18
 "No Cents" – 	4:57
 "My Three S.O.B.'s" – 	4:19
 "Lobster Boy's Revenge" – 	3:30
 "Opium Jacuzzi" – 	6:38

Personnel
Ajax  – Turntables	
Chris Cameron  – Keyboards	
Jesse Delapena  – Turntables	
Kurt Elling  – Vocals	
Trine Rein - Vocals on 'I Want You To Want Me'
Yvonne Gage  – Vocals (background)	
Ron Haynes  – Trumpet, Flugelhorn	
Frankie Hill  – Keyboards	
John Janowiak  – Trombone
Walter Sargent -Rapper/MC	
Tommy Klein  – Guitar	
Dan Leali  – Percussion, Drums	
Joe Rendon  – Timbales	
Tommy Sanchez  – Guitar	
Ricky Showalter  – Bass	
Mars Williams  – Saxophone, Sax (Alto), Sax (Soprano), Sax (Tenor), Trumpet, Producer

Production
Rick Barnes  – Engineer, Mixing	
Chris Bauer  – Assistant Engineer	
Andy Engel  – Design	
Neil Gustafson  – Engineer, Live Sound	
Eric Heintz  – Digital Imaging	
Steve Jacula  – Engineer	
Neil Jensen  – Engineer, Assistant Engineer	
Don Miller  – Photography	
Scott Ramsayer  – Engineer	
Mike Rogers  – Producer	
Paul Zerang  – Engineer, Live Sound

References

1998 albums
Liquid Soul albums
Ark 21 Records albums